The 2017 Angola Women's Handball League was the 38th edition, organized by the Federação Angolana de Andebol (Angolan Handball Federation). The tournament was held from July 10–22, 2017 in Luanda, contested by 7 teams and won by Clube Desportivo Primeiro de Agosto.

Participating teams

Squads

Preliminary rounds

Knockout stage

Championship bracket

Fifth place match

Semi-finals

Third place match

Final

  Stats

Final standings

External links
 Results - cahbonline
 Youtube video (full match)

References

Handball in Angola
Angola Women's Handball League
W